Brían Francis O'Byrne (born 16 May 1967) is an Irish actor who works and lives in the United States. He was nominated for a Primetime Emmy Award for his role in the miniseries Mildred Pierce (2011) and won a BAFTA TV Award for his role in the drama series Little Boy Blue (2017).

O'Byrne received five Tony Award nominations and won Best Featured Actor in a Play for his performance in the 2004 production of Frozen.

Early life and education
O'Byrne was born in Mullagh, a village in the south-east of County Cavan, on 16 May 1967. He attended the Samuel Beckett Centre at Trinity College (T.C.D.) in Dublin. He moved to New York City in 1990, and was cast in the Irish Repertory Theatre production of Philadelphia, Here I Come!

Career
O'Byrne first attracted notice for his performances in the Martin McDonagh plays The Beauty Queen of Leenane (1996) as Pato Dooley (for which he received a Tony Award nomination for Best Featured Actor in a Play) and The Lonesome West (1997). He is known for taking on serious and dramatic roles, such as a serial killer in Frozen (1998) (for which he won a Tony Award) and a priest accused of child molestation in Doubt: A Parable (2004), for which he received a Tony Award nomination. O'Byrne also appeared as a priest in the 2004 film Million Dollar Baby. In May 2007, O'Byrne was nominated for a Tony Award for his performance as Alexander Herzen in Tom Stoppard's 2002 trilogy The Coast of Utopia. He appeared in the play Outside Mullingar by John Patrick Shanley on Broadway in 2014, and received a nomination for the 2014 Outer Critics Circle Award, Outstanding Actor in a Play.

In 2011, O'Byrne was nominated for the Primetime Emmy Award for Outstanding Supporting Actor in a Miniseries or Movie for his performance in Mildred Pierce as Bert Pierce. O'Byrne was featured in the 2009–2010 ABC series FlashForward, in which he played Aaron Stark. The show was not renewed. FlashForward began airing in Ireland on 4 January 2010.

In 2012, O'Byrne was cast in the ABC drama pilot Gilded Lilys created and produced by Shonda Rhimes.

In 2017, O'Byrne appeared in Little Boy Blue as Steve Jones, the father of Rhys Jones who was murdered by gang members in 2007.

Personal life

O'Byrne is married to American actress Heather Goldenhersh, with whom he co-starred in the Broadway play Doubt: A Parable. The couple have two daughters.

Filmography

Film

Television

Awards and nominations

References

External links
 
 

1967 births
Living people
Best Supporting Actor BAFTA Award (television) winners
Drama Desk Award winners
Irish male film actors
Irish male stage actors
Irish male television actors
Tony Award winners
Place of birth missing (living people)
People from County Cavan
Irish emigrants to the United States